Listonella anguillarum is a Gram-negative marine bacterium in the family Vibrionaceae. The correct nomenclature for this bacterium is Vibrio anguillarum.

Vibrionales